Michael Xavier Garrett (born 1961) is a retired general in the United States Army who served as the commanding general of United States Army Forces Command from 2019 to 2022. He previously served as the commanding general of United States Army Central, chief of staff of United States Central Command and commanding general of United States Army Alaska.

The son of Edward Garrett, a retired Army command sergeant major, Garrett is from Cleveland, Ohio and attended High School in Germany. He was commissioned in 1984 into the Infantry upon his graduation from Xavier University. Garrett was nominated for promotion to general to become the commanding general of United States Army Forces Command in January 2019. He was confirmed by the Senate for the position in February and assumed command in March.

Assignments
Garrett is the commanding general of United States Army Forces Command, located at Fort Bragg, North Carolina. He previously served as the commanding general of United States Army Central, located at Shaw Air Force Base, South Carolina.

Garrett's assignments include chief of staff of United States Central Command, commanding general of United States Army Alaska, deputy commander of United States Alaskan Command and multiple joint and operational tours, staff assignments at numerous levels as well as several commands. Highlights include commanding 3rd Battalion, 325th Infantry (Airborne), 82nd Airborne Division at Fort Bragg, North Carolina. He deployed to Afghanistan as chief of current operations, Combined Task Force 180 in support of Operation Enduring Freedom. He then commanded 4th Brigade Combat Team (Airborne), 25th Infantry Division (Light), which deployed in support of Operation Iraqi Freedom. Following brigade command, Garrett served as the deputy commanding general of United States Army Recruiting Command. Following his tour with Recruiting Command, Garrett returned to Fort Bragg where he served as the Chief of Staff, XVIII Airborne Corps. As the XVIII Airborne Corps chief of staff, he deployed to Iraq in support of Operation New Dawn, where he served as the deputy chief of staff for United States Forces-Iraq.

Education
Garrett's military education includes completion of the Infantry Officer Basic and Advanced courses, the United States Army Command and General Staff College, and a prestigious Senior Service College Fellowship. He also holds a bachelor's degree in Criminal Justice from Xavier University.

Awards and decorations

References

|-

1961 births
Living people
Xavier University alumni
Military personnel from Cleveland
African-American United States Army personnel
United States Army personnel of the Iraq War
Recipients of the Distinguished Service Medal (US Army)
Recipients of the Defense Superior Service Medal
Recipients of the Legion of Merit
United States Army generals